Jack Gleeson (died November 1979) was a New Zealand rugby union team coach.

Career 
Gleeson coached the New Zealand national under-21 rugby union team from 1975 to 1976 and the New Zealand national rugby union team (the All Blacks) from 1977 to 1978. 

He was the coach (officially titled assistant manager) for the 1978 New Zealand rugby union tour of Britain and Ireland, where the All Blacks completed their first Grand Slam of four international match wins on tour of Britain and Ireland – the Rothmans Rugby Yearbook described him as a "shrewd and effective coach".

Death 
Gleeson died from cancer in 1979.

References 

1979 deaths
New Zealand national rugby union team coaches
New Zealand rugby union coaches